Alé Garza (born Alejandro Garza on May 4, 1977) is a penciler and comics artist. At the age of 18, he started working for Wildstorm, and quickly moved on to working with writers like Chris Claremont and Judd Winick, lending his art to titles like Gen¹³, Zero, E.V.E. Protomecha, Batgirl and Titans/Young Justice: Graduation Day. Aside from DC, Garza has worked on Marvel Comics's Marvel Knights Spider-Man and Top Cow's Witchblade.

From issues 16 to 19, he was the regular artist for DC's Supergirl title. Revisiting the character somewhat, he became the regular artist on Teen Titans. He joined new writer Sean McKeever and new member Supergirl with issue #51, but left the title after an issue, with no announcement.

In October 2010, he illustrated a team-up between Robin and Supergirl in Superman/Batman #77.

In January 2012, he started pencilling Deadpool, written by Daniel Way, beginning with issue #50.

External links
Alé's page at Coldfusion
Alé Garza on Supergirl

American bloggers
Living people
1977 births